Donald Wayne Smith (born October 6, 1967) is a former American football player and coach. He was the 26th head football coach at Kentucky State University in Frankfort, Kentucky, serving three seasons, from 2001 to 2003, and compiling a record of 13–20. Smith played college football at Western Kentucky University as a running back from 1987 to 1990.

Smith began his coaching career at Paul Laurence Dunbar High School in Lexington, Kentucky, where he was an assistant coach for four seasons. He then returned to his alma mater, Harrodsburg High School in  Harrodsburg, Kentucky, serving as head football coach for five seasons. Smith was the head football coach at Lafayette High School in Lexington for one season, in 2000, before he was hired by Kentucky State.

Head coaching record

College

References

1967 births
Living people
American football running backs
Kentucky State Thorobreds football coaches
Western Kentucky Hilltoppers football players
High school football coaches in Kentucky
People from Harrodsburg, Kentucky
Coaches of American football from Kentucky
Players of American football from Kentucky
African-American coaches of American football
African-American players of American football
20th-century African-American sportspeople
21st-century African-American sportspeople